Randall Brian Smith (born September 17, 1972) is a retired Major League Baseball pitcher.

Playing career
He played during one season at the major league level for the Pittsburgh Pirates. He was drafted by the Toronto Blue Jays in the 27th round of the 1994 Major League Baseball draft.

References
"Brian Smith Statistics". The Baseball Cube. 12 January 2008.
"Brian Smith Statistics". Baseball-Reference. 12 January 2008.

External links

Pelota Binaria (Venezuelan Winter League)

1972 births
Living people
Altoona Curve players
Baseball players from North Carolina
Cardenales de Lara players
American expatriate baseball players in Venezuela
Colorado Springs Sky Sox players
Dunedin Blue Jays players
Gulf Coast Pirates players
Hagerstown Suns players
Knoxville Smokies players
Major League Baseball pitchers
Medicine Hat Blue Jays players
Nashua Pride players
Nashville Sounds players
People from Salisbury, North Carolina
Pittsburgh Pirates players
Syracuse SkyChiefs players
UNC Wilmington Seahawks baseball players